Reginald Philip "Reggie" Freeman (born May 17, 1975) is an American former professional basketball player.

Playing career
Freeman played NCAA college basketball at the University of Texas. He had a prolific career at Texas, making All-Conference First Team in both his junior and senior seasons. Widely considered a first round draft candidate in the 1997 NBA Draft, he nevertheless went undrafted.

Although he never made it to the NBA, Freeman played professionally in several countries on three continents. Basketball club KK FMP from Serbia retired his jersey with number #5 for the great contribution he had made during his tenure with the team. He is regarded as one of the best foreign players to ever play for any Serbian basketball team.

National team career 
Freeman was a member of the U.S. Virgin Islands national basketball team at the 2009 FIBA Americas Championship.

Career statistics

EuroLeague

|-
| style="text-align:left;"| 2001–02
| style="text-align:left;"| Cibona
| 12 || 1 || 25.1 || .436 || .294 || .795 || 4.3 || 1.7 || .9 || .4 || 10.7 || 9.7
|-
| style="text-align:left;"| 2005–06
| style="text-align:left;"| Žalgiris
| 19 || 18 || 30.9 || .397 || .349 || .788 || 3.8 || 2.3 || 1.3 || .1 || 11.2 || 9.8
|- class="sortbottom"
| style="text-align:left;"| Career
| style="text-align:left;"|
| 31 || 19 || 28.6 || .410 || .328 || .791 || 4.0 || 2.1 || 1.1 || .2 || 11.0 || 9.8

References

External links
 Reggie Freeman at abaliga.com
 Reggie Freeman at euroleague.net
 Reggie Freeman at legabasket.it
 Reggie Freeman at tblstat.net

1975 births
Living people
ABA League players
African-American basketball players
American expatriate basketball people in Croatia
American expatriate basketball people in France
American expatriate basketball people in Greece
American expatriate basketball people in Italy
American expatriate basketball people in Lithuania
American expatriate basketball people in Poland
American expatriate basketball people in Serbia
American expatriate basketball people in Turkey
American expatriate basketball people in Venezuela
American men's basketball players
Basketball players from New York City
ASVEL Basket players
BC Žalgiris players
Cocodrilos de Caracas players
Connecticut Pride players
İstanbul Teknik Üniversitesi B.K. players
KK Cibona players
KK Crvena zvezda players
KK FMP (1991–2011) players
KK Metalac Valjevo players
KK Vojvodina Srbijagas players
Orlandina Basket players
Quad City Thunder players
Rethymno B.C. players
Roseto Sharks players
Shooting guards
Sportspeople from the Bronx
Stal Ostrów Wielkopolski players
Texas Longhorns men's basketball players
United States Virgin Islands men's basketball players
21st-century African-American sportspeople
20th-century African-American sportspeople